The Dictatorship of the Proletariat (published in German as Die Diktatur des Proletariats) is the name of a 1918 pamphlet by prominent Marxist Karl Kautsky. The work criticizes the Bolsheviks, arguing they eschewed democracy in favor of military force when establishing the Russian SFSR. Kautsky argues that "the antagonism of the two Socialist movements [i.e., Bolshevism and non-Bolshevism] is not based on small personal jealousies: it is the clashing of two fundamentally distinct methods, that of democracy and that of dictatorship." Kautsky concludes that the Bolshevik understanding of "dictatorship of the proletariat" "does not promise good results for the proletariat, either from the standpoint of theory or from that of the special Russian conditions."

See also
 Terrorism and Communism, a response to Kautsky written by Leon Trotsky
 The Proletarian Revolution and the Renegade Kautsky, a response written by Vladimir Lenin

References

External links 

 Karl Kautsky, The Dictatorship of the Proletariat (1918). H.J. Stenning, trans. London: National Labour Press, n.d. [c. 1925].
 The Dictatorship of the Proletariat at the Marxists Internet Archive

1918 non-fiction books
Karl Kautsky
Books about the Soviet Union
Books about the Russian Revolution